Aivars Polis (born 3 March 1972) is a Latvian luger. He competed in the men's doubles event at the 1992 Winter Olympics.

References

External links
 

1972 births
Living people
Latvian male lugers
Olympic lugers of Latvia
Lugers at the 1992 Winter Olympics
People from Auce